"The Glorious Dead" is the eighth episode of the fourth series of the period drama Upstairs, Downstairs. It was first broadcast on 2 November 1974 on ITV.

Background
"The Glorious Dead" was filmed on 11 and 12 July 1974. While Elizabeth Jane Howard was credited as the writer, the script editor Alfred Shaughnessy largely rewrote Howard's script. The episode was set in 1916.

Cast
Angela Baddeley - Mrs Bridges
Gordon Jackson - Hudson 
Jean Marsh - Rose 
Meg Wynn Owen - Hazel Bellamy
Simon Williams - James Bellamy 
Jacqueline Tong - Daisy
Eileen Way - Madame Francini
Helena McCarthy - Mrs Speedwell
Graham Leaman - Mr Price

Plot
Rose gets a letter from Captain Peter Graham, Gregory's company commander telling her that her fiancé Gregory has been killed. He was shot by a sniper while returning from morning patrol. Mrs Bridges comforts Rose and tells her how when she was a kitchen maid over 30 years ago, she fell for a groom called Frederick, who later died of a fever in Sudan while he was acting as a batman. Mrs Bridges then advises that Rose goes to see a spiritualist called Madame Francini, which she does, but when Waltzing Matilda plays during the séance, Rose breaks down and runs out of the house.

Also, James is awarded the Military Cross and comes home on leave. Just before he arrives home, Hazel reads in the newspaper that Lt. Jack Dyson MC has been killed in an aerial battle, but immediately has to comfort Rose when she comes back from Madame Francini's. Then James arrives home and Hazel has to hide her grief. A depressed James tells Hazel about the war, and he gives Hazel an account he has written that he wants published if he is killed. Meanwhile, James speaks to Rose and tells her how proud she should be of Gregory. Later, when James opens a drawer he sees the letters from Lt. Jack Dyson MC and photo of him, but he closes the drawer and says nothing.

Reception
In The Evening News, Richard Afton wrote that the programme was "running downhill fast". He said that "The Glorious Dead", "with its sordid intrigues, mumbo-jumbo sense and long, philosophical speeches was a bore".

Footnotes

References
Richard Marson, "Inside UpDown - The Story of Upstairs, Downstairs", Kaleidoscope Publishing, 2005
Updown.org.uk - Upstairs, Downstairs Fansite

Upstairs, Downstairs (series 4) episodes
1974 British television episodes
Fiction set in 1916